Stefan Heck (born 18 August 1982) is a German politician for the CDU and since 2021 has been a member of the Bundestag, the federal diet.

Life and politics 

Heck was born 1982 in the West German city of Marburg and studied law in order to become a lawyer. Heck was elected to the Bundestag in 2021.

References 

Living people
1982 births
Christian Democratic Union of Germany politicians
Members of the Bundestag 2021–2025
21st-century German politicians